Turnbull Lake is a  lake located on Vancouver Island north of Great Central Lake, south east of Elsie Lake.

References

Alberni Valley
Lakes of Vancouver Island
Newcastle Land District